The Government of the 29th Dáil or the 26th Government of Ireland (6 June 2002 – 14 June 2007) was the government of Ireland formed after the 2002 general election which had been held on 17 May 2002. It was led by Fianna Fáil leader Bertie Ahern as Taoiseach, with Progressive Democrats leader Mary Harney as Tánaiste. It was the first, and to date only, coalition government to be returned to government after an election; both parties increased their number of seats, and together secured a Dáil majority, where in the previous government they had governed together as a minority government dependent on the support of Independent TDs.

The 26th Government lasted for  days.

26th Government of Ireland

Nomination of Taoiseach
The 29th Dáil first met on 6 June 2002. In the debate on the nomination of Taoisech, outgoing Taoiseach and Fianna Fáil leader Bertie Ahern, Fine Gael leader Enda Kenny, Labour Party leader Ruairi Quinn, and Green Party leader Trevor Sargent were each proposed. Ahern received the nomination of the Dáil. Ahern was re-appointed as Taoiseach by President Mary McAleese.

Members of the Government
After his appointment as Taoiseach by the president, Bertie Ahern proposed the members of the government and they were approved by the Dáil. They were appointed by the president on the same day.

Changes to departments

Attorney General
Rory Brady SC was appointed by the president as Attorney General on the nomination of the Taoiseach.

Ministers of State
On 6 June 2002, the Government on the nomination of the Taoiseach appointed Mary Hanafin to the post of Minister for State at the Department of the Taoiseach with special responsibility as Government Chief Whip and Dick Roche, the position of Minister of State at the Department of the Taoiseach and the Department of Foreign Affairs, with special responsibility for European Affairs. On 18 June, the Taoiseach announced that the Government had appointed with effect from 19 June the other 15 Ministers of State and that the Government had also appointed Mary Hanafin to be Minister of State at the Department of Defence.

Dissolution
On 29 April 2007, the president dissolved the Dáil on the advice of the Taoiseach, and a general election was held on 24 May. The members of the 30th Dáil met on 14 June and Bertie Ahern was re-appointed as Taoiseach and formed a new government.

See also
Constitution of Ireland
Politics of the Republic of Ireland

References

External links

2002 establishments in Ireland
2007 disestablishments in Ireland
29th Dáil
Cabinets established in 2002
Cabinets disestablished in 2007
Coalition governments of Ireland
Governments of Ireland